Wojciech Roman Ruszkowski (29 May 1897 – 29 December 1976) was a Polish film actor. He appeared in ten films between 1933 and 1967.

Selected filmography
 Prokurator Alicja Horn (1933)
 Co mój mąż robi w nocy (1934)
 Love, Cherish, Respect (1934)
 A Diplomatic Wife (1937)

References

External links

1897 births
1976 deaths
Polish male film actors
Actors from Lviv
People from the Kingdom of Galicia and Lodomeria
Polish Austro-Hungarians
Polish male stage actors
20th-century Polish male actors